Raymond Newton Preston III (born June 12, 1982, in San Diego, California) is a former American football center for the Buffalo Bills and Dallas Cowboys. He was drafted by the Buffalo Bills in the fourth round of the 2005 NFL Draft. He played college football at Illinois.

Early years
Preston graduated from Mt. Carmel High School in San Diego, where he practiced football and baseball.

College career
Preston accepted a football scholarship from the University of Illinois. He was a three-year starter at center and only allowed one sack in his last two seasons. He started 35 straight games.

Professional career

Buffalo Bills
Preston was selected by the Buffalo Bills in the fourth round (122nd overall) of the 2005 NFL Draft. He competed for the starting position to help fill the void left with the departure of Trey Teague. As a rookie, he played in all 16 games, starting one game for the injured Chris Villarrial, while playing on special teams. He was also named to The Sporting News All-Rookie Team.

In 2006, Preston appeared in all 16 games for the Bills while starting in 8 of the contests. In 2007, Preston failed to start in any games for the Bills, but made appearances in 13 of the club's 16 games.

In 2008, Preston started a career-high 11 games, all at center, sharing time with Melvin Fowler. He has also played some guard and right tackle for the Bills making appearances in 15 of the teams 16 contests.

During the four years Preston spent with the Bills, he appeared in 59 of the teams 64 contests while getting a starting nod in 20 of them. After the 2008 season, Preston became an unrestricted free agent. In 2009, Preston and Fowler were replaced by Geoff Hangartner.

Green Bay Packers
On March 30, 2009, he was signed as a free agent by the Green Bay Packers. He was released on August 25.

Dallas Cowboys
On August 26, 2009, he signed with the Dallas Cowboys, declining offers from the Cleveland Browns and Oakland Raiders. He was released on October 10, to make room for Chauncey Washington who was signed from the practice squad. He was re-signed on October 12, after Washington was waived. He was declared inactive in 15 regular season games and 2 playoff games.

On May 8, 2010, Preston announced his retirement from professional football.

Personal life
His father, Ray Preston, was a standout football player at Syracuse University, and had a nine-year NFL career with the San Diego Chargers. He has one sister Casie currently living and teaching in Indianapolis.

After football, he earned a master's degree in Christian Education from the Dallas Theological Seminary. In 2013, he was hired as the Program Director for the University of Notre Dame's Student Welfare and Development. In 2015, he was hired by the Tampa Bay Buccaneers as the team's director of player engagement.

References

1982 births
Living people
Players of American football from San Diego
American football offensive guards
American football centers
Illinois Fighting Illini football players
Buffalo Bills players
Dallas Cowboys players
Dallas Theological Seminary alumni
University of Notre Dame faculty